was king of the Ryukyu Kingdom from 1573 to 1588. Shō Ei was the son of Shō Gen and his wife, and was the second son of king Shō Gen.

He died in 1588 without an heir. His son-in-law Shō Nei was installed as the king.

References

Kerr, George H. (2000). Okinawa: the History of an Island People. (revised ed.) Boston: Tuttle Publishing.

Second Shō dynasty
Kings of Ryūkyū
1559 births
1588 deaths